Terence Thomas Evans (March 25, 1940August 10, 2011) was a judge of the United States Court of Appeals for the Seventh Circuit and a United States district judge for the Eastern District of Wisconsin.  Earlier in his career, he was a Wisconsin Circuit Court Judge in Milwaukee County.

Early life, education, and career
Born in Milwaukee, Wisconsin, Evans received a Bachelor of Arts degree from Marquette University in 1962 and his Juris Doctor from Marquette University Law School in 1967. He was a law clerk to Wisconsin Supreme Court judge Horace W. Wilkie, from 1967 to 1968. He then served as an assistant district attorney for Milwaukee County, Wisconsin from 1968 to 1970, was in private practice from 1970 to 1974, and was a circuit court judge in Milwaukee from 1978 to 1980.

Federal judicial service
On July 21, 1979,  Evans was nominated by President Jimmy Carter to a new seat United States District Court for the Eastern District of Wisconsin created by 92 Stat. 1629. He was confirmed by the United States Senate on October 31, 1979, and received his commission on November 2, 1979. He served as Chief Judge from 1991 to 1995. His service terminated on August 11, 1995, due to his elevation to the Seventh Circuit.

On April 25, 1995, Evans was nominated by President Bill Clinton for elevation to a seat on the United States Court of Appeals for the Seventh Circuit vacated by Richard Dickson Cudahy. Evans was confirmed by the United States Senate on August 11, 1995, and received his commission the same day. On July 28, 2009, the Milwaukee Journal Sentinel reported that Evans has notified the President of his intention to assume senior status on January 7, 2010, on the "30-year anniversary of when he first took the federal bench." He assumed senior status in 2010, serving in that capacity until his death. Evans died suddenly on August 11, 2011, as a result of idiopathic pulmonary fibrosis and acute respiratory distress syndrome.

Pragmatism and humor
Evans' judicial philosophy was marked by pragmatism, an approach well-served at the appellate level by his previous experience as a trial judge. He is particularly known for his sense of humor, and his willingness and ability to weave lighthearted remarks into his judicial opinions. Perhaps the best known example of this was the judge's opinion in United States v. Murphy, in which the following footnote was included:

Judge Richard Posner was also once the subject of Evans's wit, when he stated:

In another memorable quote, Evans described a case as "gummed up from the get-go", describing a case where petitioner Johnson lost his chance to be heard in federal Habeas Corpus (and thus dooming him to serve the remainder of his two consecutive life sentences) because of a delay caused by the state court which made petitioner Johnson's otherwise "properly filed" application for state review technically out of time.

An often-cited district court decision in an admiralty case from 1984 showed Evans' use of humor to veil his impatience with arguments he thought invalid:

In Crawford v. Marion County Election Board (2007), Evans dissented when Posner, joined by Diane S. Sykes, upheld Indiana's voter ID law.  The Seventh Circuit's judgment was then upheld by a fractured majority of the Supreme Court of the United States.

According to the technology website CNET.com, Evans became the first federal judge to cite a YouTube video, in a published opinion he authored July 9, 2007. Evans rejected an insurer's malpractice lawsuit against its attorney, warning that if there were liability "litigation would become more of a blood sport than it already is. Lawyers would be even more obsessive about irrelevant and tedious details. No good could come of it."

References

Sources

1940 births
2011 deaths
Judges of the United States Court of Appeals for the Seventh Circuit
Judges of the United States District Court for the Eastern District of Wisconsin
Marquette University alumni
Marquette University Law School alumni
Lawyers from Milwaukee
United States court of appeals judges appointed by Bill Clinton
United States district court judges appointed by Jimmy Carter
20th-century American judges
Wisconsin state court judges
District attorneys in Wisconsin
21st-century American judges